Bono Velanti (3 August 1945) is the current Gaanman of the Ndyuka nation of Suriname. Bono Velanti was elected to succeed the late Gazon Matodya as Gaanman in 2015 and was subsequently sworn in by President Desi Bouterse of Suriname on 3 February 2016.

References 

1945 births
Ndyuka people
Surinamese Maroons
Granman
People from Sipaliwini District
Living people